ISSI or Issi may refer to:

 Ikatan Sepeda Seluruh Indonesia, Indonesia Cycling Federation
 Indonesia Sharia Stock Index
 International Space Science Institute
 International Society for Scientometrics and Informetrics
 Integrated Silicon Solution Inc.
 Issi saaneq, a species of sauropodomorph dinosaur